Brachyplatystoma tigrinum, the zebra shovelnose, or tigerstriped catfish, is a species of catfish of the family Pimelodidae that is native to Brazil, Colombia and Peru.

Distribution
The fish is recorded from Upper Amazon basin, Cachoeira do Teotônio, northwestern Brazil as well as Caquetá, and Putomayo basins in Colombia and Ucayali and Marañon watersheds in Peru.

Description
It grows to a length of 500 mm. Head elongate and compressed. Upper and lower caudal filaments. The coloration is sometimes confused with B. juruense, but strips are continuous other than divided and has a longer upper jaw. Body is yellow to almost white base colour to the body with black stripes.

Ecology
The fish inhabits white-colored water with a high proportion of dissolved solids, low transparency, high dissolved oxygen.

It is entirely piscivorous.

References

Pimelodidae
Catfish of South America
Freshwater fish of Brazil
Freshwater fish of Peru
Freshwater fish of Colombia
Taxa named by Heraldo Antonio Britski
Fish described in 1981